The canton of Cannes-2 is an administrative division of the Alpes-Maritimes department, southeastern France. It was created at the French canton reorganisation which came into effect in March 2015. Its seat is in Cannes.

It consists of the following communes:
Cannes (partly)

References

Cantons of Alpes-Maritimes